Badhaai Ho Badhaai is a 2002 Indian Hindi-language romantic comedy film starring Anil Kapoor, Keerthi Reddy and Shilpa Shetty. The film is the Hindi remake of the 1996 Tamil movie Poove Unakkaga.

Plot
The D'Souza and the Chaddha families are neighbors and have been good friends for as long as they can remember, and despite their differing religions and cultural beliefs, celebrate Diwali and Christmas with cheer and gusto. Then Anjali Chaddha and Anthony D'Souza fall in love, and this brings an end to the friendship. Anjali and Anthony elope, marry, and re-locate to another place, leaving the two families to live with bitterness the rest of their lives. Twenty-seven years later, a young man claiming to be the son of Anjali and Anthony comes to visit his paternal and maternal grandparents, and is cold-shouldered by both families. He persists and wins over the hearts of his grandparents on both sides, but before he can win over his Jassi mama and Moses chacha, they find out that Raja is not who he claims to be.

Cast
 Anil Kapoor as Raja Saxena   
 Shilpa Shetty as Banto Betty / Tina
 Keerti Reddy as Florence D'Souza
 Amrish Puri as Mr. Chaddha
 Farida Jalal as Mrs. Chaddha
 Kader Khan as Ghuman Singh Rathod
 Anang Desai as Moses D'Souza
 Rohini Hattangadi as Rosy D'Souza
 Vinay Jain as Ranjeet Chaddha
 Dinesh Kaushik as Banto Betty's father
 Mushtaq Khan as Bali
 Suresh Menon as Lucky Iyer
 Govind Namdeo as Jassi Chaddha
 Hemant Pandey as Writer
 K. Vishwanath as Mr. D'Souza
 Aavin Ashta as Ravi son of Mr. Chaddha
 Rana Jung Bahadur as Khan

Soundtrack
The soundtrack for the movie has been composed by Anu Malik and the lyrics are by Javed Akhtar.

References

External links
 

2000s Hindi-language films
Hindi remakes of Tamil films
2002 films
Films set in Delhi
Films scored by Anu Malik
Films directed by Satish Kaushik